Practical Kabbalah ( Kabbalah Ma'asit) in historical Judaism, is a branch of the Jewish mystical tradition that concerns the use of magic. It was considered permitted white magic by its practitioners, reserved for the elite, who could separate its spiritual source from Qliphoth realms of evil if performed under circumstances  that were holy (Q-D-Š) and pure, tumah and taharah. The concern of overstepping Judaism's strong prohibitions of impure magic ensured it remained a minor tradition in Jewish history. Its teachings include the use of Divine and angelic names for amulets and incantations.

Practical Kabbalah is mentioned in historical texts, but most Kabbalists have taught that its use is forbidden. It is contrasted with the mainstream tradition in Kabbalah of Kabbalah Iyunit (contemplative Kabbalah), that seeks to explain the nature of God and the nature of existence through theological study and Jewish meditative techniques.

According to Gershom Scholem, many of the teachings of practical Kabbalah predate and are independent of the theoretical Kabbalah which is usually associated with the term:

History

Early practices
Halakha (Jewish religious law) forbids divination and other forms of soothsaying, and the Talmud lists many persistent yet condemned divining practices. The very frequency with which divination is mentioned is taken as an indication that it was widely practiced in the folk religion of ancient Israel, and a limited number of forms of divination were generally accepted within all of Israelite society, the most common being oneiromancy (interpretation of dreams for prophetic meanings). Other magical practices of Judaic folk religion which became part of practical Kabbalah date from Talmudic times and include the making of amulets and other folk remedies using the esoteric names of angels.

Merkabah mysticism

In Talmudic and Gaonic times, rabbinic mysticism focused around exegesis of Ezekiel's vision of the divine Chariot-Throne, and meditative introspective ascent into the heavenly chambers. This elite practical mysticism, as described in the esoteric Hekhalot literature, incorporated and merged into magical incantation elements. The Talmud and Midrash refer to this as "using the Divine Name" for theurgic-practical ascent, as in the story of the Ten Martyrs who enquired in Heaven of the decree. In the Hekhalot literature, angels guarding each level are meditatively bound by formulae and seals to allow entry.

Medieval Hasidei Ashkenaz and the Sefer Yetzirah

In the 13th century, one problem which intrigued the Ashkenazi Hasidim (literally "the Pious of Germany") was the possibility of the creation of life through magical means. They used the word "golem" (literally, shapeless or lifeless matter) to refer to an hypothetical homunculus given life by means of the magical invocation of Divine names. This interest inspired an entire cycle of legend revolving around the golem which continued into the 18th century. The identification of the ancient Sefer Yetzirah concerning the creative force of the Hebrew letters as the means to create a golem was derived from interpretation of two statements in the Babylonian Talmud, Tractate Sanhedrin. One relates that amora Abba ben Joseph bar Ḥama ("Rava") created a person; in the second, two other Sages were studying "the laws of "creation" and created a "triple calf" that they ate for a celebration.

Medieval separation of Conceptual and Practical Kabbalah

The separation of the mystical and magical elements of Kabbalah, dividing it into speculative theological Kabbalah (Kabbalah Iyyunit) with its meditative traditions, and theurgic practical Kabbalah (Kabbalah Ma'asit), had occurred by the beginning of the 14th century. Many traditional speculative Kabbalists disapproved of practical Kabbalah, including Abraham Abulafia, who strongly condemned it. While the great majority of historical Kabbalistic involvement, writing and development concerns the theological Kabbalah, the majority of practical Kabbalaistic writings were never published.

One important tradition of practical Kabbalah thrived in Spain during the second half of the 15th century, before the Alhambra Decree. The main text of the tradition was called Sepher ha-Mashiv. The practitioners of this tradition were described by Moshe Idel as "interested in demonology and the use of coercive incantations to summon demons, angels, and even God" in order to hasten the Messianic Age. Joseph Della Reina's (1418–1472) failure with his students in this, was considered a warning by later Kabbalists of the potential perils of involvement with Kabbalistic practice.

Ban of Safed Kabbalistic Renaissance
In the 16th century Isaac Luria, who opposed Kabbalah Ma'asit and forbade his students from writing amulets and using other techniques of practical Kabbalah, evolved a form of exorcism which effectively transferred techniques from practical to speculative Kabbalah. While this led to the displacement of magical formulas and rites by contemplative exercises, the old forms of practical Kabbalah continued to exert broad appeal. Luria's position as the central teacher of modern Kabbalah, the foundation for later Hasidism, gives his proscription authoritative force. He taught that in our generations, without the Temple in Jerusalem and its ashes of the Red Heifer to purify, the pursuit of the realm of practical Kabbalah by a person with an impure body is very detrimental.

Early modern Baalei Shem and other developments
The traditional role of the Baal Shem healer involved accepted methods between borderline practical Kabbalah and meditative Kabbalah, such as amulets and psychic abilities. Among recorded figures from early-modern times were Elijah Ba'al Shem of Chelm (1550–1583) and the Baal Shem of London (1708–1782). Yisrael Baal Shem Tov began his activity as a traditional Baal Shem, before founding Hasidism. While the association of the Maharal of Prague (1520–1609) with the creation of a golem only emerged in later times, contemporary tradition records Elijah Baal Shem as creating a golem. The Sabbatean mystical heresies of Sabbatai Zevi (1626–1676) and Jacob Frank (1726–1791) led to the 1750s accusation of Jonathan Eybeschütz by Jacob Emden of being a secret Sabbatean. It was chiefly based on the interpretation of some amulets prepared by Eybeschütz, in which Emden saw Sabbatean allusions. The leader of Mitnagdic Lithuanian Judaism, the Kabbalist Vilna Gaon (1720–1797), related that in his youth he had attempted to make a golem, but stopped when he perceived a spirit of impurity involved.

Rabbi Aharon Yehuda of Chelm, a practitioner of practical Kabbalah, and baal shem, was said to have created a golem through use of the divine name.

Rabbi Yhitzak Ayhiz Halpern, a practitioner of practical Kabbalah, and baal shem, was said to have saved a ship from capsizing, and to have exorcised a dybbuk.

Rabbi Naftali Katz of Posnan was said to have brought a dead man back to life to free his wife from agunah.

Rabbi Hirsch Fraenkel was sentenced to imprisonment in Germany in 1713, on the basis of having a library of books said to contain examples of sorcery, such as how to use oaths, and amulets to overcome demons, see the future, and speak to the dead.

Divine intercession through Deveikut by the Hasidic Tzadik

In Hasidism, the displacement of practical Kabbalah using directly magical means, by conceptual and meditative trends gained much further emphasis, while simultaneously instituting meditative theurgy for material blessings at the heart of its social mysticism. Hasidism internalised Kabbalah through the psychology of deveikut (cleaving to God), and cleaving to the Tzadik (Hasidic Rebbe). In Hasidic doctrine, the tzaddik channels Divine spiritual and physical bounty to his followers by altering the Will of God (uncovering a deeper concealed Will) through his own deveikut and self-nullification. Dov Ber of Mezeritch is concerned to distinguish this theory of the Tzadik's will altering and deciding the Divine Will, from directly magical process.<ref>Studies in East European Jewish Mysticism and Hasidism, Joseph Weiss, Littman Library; chapter: "The Saddik - Altering the Divine Will</ref> This rendered the external methods of practical Kabbalah, its willed power over angels and lower spiritual forces, as unnecessary and a hindrance, though some Hasidic leaders retained use of traditional amulets at the borderline of practical Kabbalah.

This change was manifested in the personal life of Hasidism's founder, the Baal Shem Tov (1698–1760), in his move from Baal Shem to the prototype of Hasidic leader. While a Baal Shem, he used amulets. At the end of his life, the Ba'al Shem Tov never wrote the Names of God, only his own name in amulets, Yisrael ben Sara or Yisrael ben Eliezer. A traditional story relates that on one early occasion the Baal Shem Tov resorted to practical Kabbalistic names of God, to cross a river and save his life. Afterward he regretted this, even though he had used it in holiness. He knew that his repentance was accepted when later, he found himself again in a similar situation. This time he did not use practical Kabbalah to perform the miracle, but instead used faith to give him the miraculous supernatural power to cross the river. He then knew that his teshuvah was complete. Hasidic thought teaches that its internalised mysticism enables the divine soul to affect the world through its essential connection to God, rather than Divine manifestations of Kabbalah.

Methods

Despite the prohibition against divination of the future, there is no prohibition against understanding the past nor coming to a greater understanding of present and future situations through inspiration gained by the Kabbalah (a subtle distinction and one often hard to delineate). The appeal to occult power outside the monotheist deity for divination purpose is unacceptable in Judaism, but at the same time it is held that the righteous have access to occult knowledge. Such knowledge can come through dreams and incubation (inducing clairvoyant dreams), Metoposcopy (reading faces, lines on the face, or auras emanating from the face), ibburim and maggidim (spirit possession), and/or various methods of scrying.

The Midrash and Talmud are replete with the use of names of God and incantations that are claimed to effect supernatural or theurgic results. Most post-Talmudic rabbinical literature seeks to curb the use of any or most of these formulae, termed Kabbalah Ma'asit ("practical Kabbalah"). There are various arguments for this; one stated by the Medieval Rabbi Yaakov ben Moshe Levi Moelin is that the person using it may lack the required grounding, and the ritual would be ineffective.

Yet the interest in these rituals of power continued largely unabated until recently. The Talmud  mentions the use of charms for healing, and a wide range of magical cures were sanctioned by rabbis. It was ruled that any practice actually producing a cure was not to be considered superstitious and there has been the widespread practice of medicinal amulets, and folk remedies (segullot) in Jewish societies across time and geography.

Image gallery

See also
 Angels in Judaism
 Jewish magical papyri
 Names of God in Judaism
 Sefer HaRazim Semitic neopaganism
 Witchcraft and divination in the Hebrew Bible
 Jewish views on astrology

Notes

References
 Dan, Joseph. Kabbalah: A Very Short Introduction. Oxford University Press US, 2006. 
 Faierstein, Morris M. (ed., trans.). Jewish Mystical Autobiographies: Book of Visions and Book of Secrets. Paulist Press, 1999. 
 Finkel, Avraham Yaakov. Sefer Chasidim: The Book of the Pious. Jason Aronson, 1997. 
 Mirecki, Paul & Meyer, Marvin W. (eds.).  Magic and Ritual in the Ancient World. Brill, 1995. 
 Sherwin, Byron L. The Golem Legend: Origins and Implications. University Press of America, 1985. 
 Swart, Jacobus G. The Book of Sacred Names. Sangreal Sodality Press, Johannesburg, 2011. 
 Swart, Jacobus G. The Book of Seals & Amulets. Sangreal Sodality Press, Johannesburg, 2014. 
 Trachtenberg, Joshua. "The Folk Element in Judaism" in The Journal of Religion'', Vol. 22, No. 2 (Apr., 1942), pp. 173–186. ISSN 0022-4189

External links

Practical Kabbalah
What is Practical Kabbalah?
Learn Qabalah | Practical Qabalah
Kabbalistic Amulets Spiritual Protection | Traditional Kabbalistic Amulets